Gouden ketenen  is a 1917 Dutch silent film directed by Maurits Binger.

Cast
 Annie Bos - Lona
 Cor Smits - Van Haaften
 Cecil Ryan - Henri van Rhenen
 Eugène Beeckman
 Lola Cornero
 Paula de Waart - Mevrouw van Borselen
 Fred Homann
 Piet Te Nuyl
 Jeanne Van der Pers - Henri's zuster
 Willem van der Veer
 Jan van Dommelen - Kolonel van Borselen / Zeeman

External links 
 

1917 films
Dutch silent feature films
Dutch black-and-white films
Films directed by Maurits Binger